Bettongs,  species of the genus Bettongia, are potoroine marsupials once common in Australia. They are important ecosystem engineers displaced during the colonisation of the continent, and are vulnerable to threatening factors such as altered fire regimes, land clearing, pastoralism and introduced predatory species such as the fox and cat.

Conservation status 
All species of the genus have been severely affected by ecological changes since the European settlement of Australia. Those that have not become extinct became largely confined to islands and protected reserves and are dependent on re-population programs. The diversity of the genus was poorly understood before their extirpation from the mainland, and new taxa have been identified in specimens newly discovered and already held in museum collections. In 2021 August, 40 Bettongs were released in different parts of South Australia; they were raised in captivity to increase their numbers.

Taxonomy 
Four extant species are recognised in the work Mammal Species of the World (2005):

 Bettongia gaimardi, Eastern bettong, also known as the Tasmanian bettong
 Bettongia lesueur Boodie
 Bettongia penicillata Woylie
 Bettongia tropica Wakefield, 1967. Northern bettong
In addition, at least three extinct species are known:

 Bettongia moyesi, Middle Miocene bettong from Riversleigh
 Bettongia pusilla, Nullarbor dwarf bettong, known only from subfossil remains, probably became extinct after colonisation
Bettongia anhydra, described in 2015 from a specimen collected in 1933 near Lake Mackay, Northern Territory.
The phylogeny of the genus has seen a grouping of 'brush-tailed' taxa allied within the genus Bettongia, and this includes the extant species Bettongia gaimardi, B. tropica and B. penicillata.

A conservative arrangement of modern and fossil taxa of Bettongia may be summarised as

 family Potoroidae:

 subfamily †Bulungamayinae
 subfamily †Palaeopotoroinae
 subfamily Potoroinae
 genus Aepyprymnus
 genus Bettongia
 species †Bettongia anhydra
 species Bettongia gaimardi
 species Bettongia lesueur
 species †Bettongia moyesi
 species Bettongia penicillata
 species †Bettongia pusilla
 species Bettongia tropica
 genus †Milliyowi
 genus †Caloprymnus
 genus Potorous
 genus †Purtia
 genus †Wakiewakie
 genus †Gumardee

The species Aepyprymnus rufescens is referred to as the rufous bettong, despite not being a member of the genus Bettongia.

See also
 Kangaroo rat - a heteromyid rodent of North America

References

Marsupial genera
Marsupials of Australia
Bettongia
Taxa named by John Edward Gray